The 2015–16 season was Aris Thessaloniki the second in Gamma Ethniki (3rd level). The team finished 1st with a 21-point difference from the second club and was promoted to Football League, the greek second division.
 
They was also compete in the Macedonia Football Clubs Association Cup with its U17 team, where eliminated in the Phase E by Niki Mesimeri.

On 17 September 2015, Nikos Anastopoulos appointed as manager.

First-team squad

Competitions

Overall

1 The Gamma Ethniki Cup did not hold that season
2 In the EPSM Cup Aris Thessaloniki used the U17 team (players and manager)

Overview

{| class="wikitable" style="text-align: center"
|-
!rowspan=2|Competition
!colspan=8|Record
|-
!
!
!
!
!
!
!
!
|-
| Gamma Ethniki

|-
| Gamma Ethniki Cup1

|-
| EPSM Cup2

|-
! Total

1 The Gamma Ethniki Cup did not hold that season
2 In the EPSM Cup Aris Thessaloniki used the U17 team (players and manager)

Gamma Ethniki

League table

Results summary

Results by matchday

Matches

Gamma Ethniki Cup

The 2015-16 season the Gamma Ethniki Cup did not hold

EPSM Cup

Aris Thessaloniki qualified from the Phase D without game. In Phase E the club played with Niki Mesimeri and used the U17 players and manager.

Squad statistics

Appearances

Goals

1 Player from U17 team

Clean sheets

References

External links
 Aris Thessaloniki F.C. official website

2015-16
Greek football clubs 2015–16 season